Somalis in Ethiopia refers to ethnic Somalis residing in Ethiopia, particularly in the Somali Region. Their language is primarily Somali and are majority Islam adhering. According to 2008 census based on Central Statistical Authority, Somali was the third largest ethnic group in Ethiopia with 4,560,000 population, accounting 6.2% after Oromo (34.4%), Amhara (27%).

History

Early presence

Somalis first appeared around 1200 AD and began building nation-state networks to various states in the forms of sultanates since the 16th century. In 1550, they converted to Islam under influence of Arab traders settled near coast of present-day Somalia. Adal Sultanate was one of the most powerful state with capital Zeila (in present-day Somaliland) in the 15th and 16th centuries.

There is no ample evidence that Somalis inhabited Greater Ethiopia until the expansion of Emperor Menelik II to south, south-east in the late 19th century. There are historical records that Ethiopia accessed port of Zeila, but not Ogaden included to the subject.

1884–1960
In 1884, during the Scramble for Africa, a vast land of Somalia fell under three colonial domains: the British protectorate of Somaliland was established through a number of Anglo-Somali Treaties of Protection. In the same manner, the Italians took direct claims of Italian Somalia and it's coast in 1889. This was resolved in 1891 Anglo-Italian Treaty with British colonial powers on their sphere of influence in the East Africa (mainly Ethiopia, Somalia, and Eritrea).   

In accordance with Treaty of Wuchale (1889) signed between Ethiopia and Italy, Italy, acting as protector of Ethiopia, demarcated the boundary between Ethiopia and British Somaliland as follows:
On reaching the eighth degree of the north latitude the line follows that parallel as far as its intersection with the 48th degree of longitude east of Greenwich.Ignoring the Anglo-Italian Treaty that laid foundation of Gadabuursi tribe land under British protectorate, Menelik attempted and penetrated Somali territory in 1896 by building some grass hits at Alola, a spring located in the southeast of Biyo Kabobe. Menelik erected flag by claiming Gadabuursi and Issa tribe's territories (in present-day Shinile, Jijiga to Awbare) belongs to the Ethiopian Empire.  
Menelik proposed boundary extension of his Empire to Western Somali territories of Ogaden and submitted to Italy on 24 June 1896, and one year later. Italy unilaterally agreed its boundaries by only telegraphing without proper agreement. In 1897, the Ethiopian Empire continued its expansion territories of the south and southeast where Somali people settled, reached an agreement with the British to demarcate border between Ethiopia and British Somaliland, excluding Haud in Ethiopia. In the treaty, British ceded Somali territory to the Menelik in exchange for his help fighting against Somali clans. However, the treaty occurred when Ethiopia, the British administration and Somali people were not consulted and informed. In addition, the treaty violated an agreement between the British and Somali clans in which it was one of the main reasons that Somali's denied the validity of the treaty. 

In 1907, Anglo-Ethiopian Agreement demarcated their boundary with the British East African protectorate (Kenya). This placed Italian Somaliland in a rectangular point where Dewa and Genale rivers conjoin.

In December 1934, the Welwal incident was erupted in Welwal located in Dollo Zone of the Somali, as the beginning of the Second Italo-Ethiopian War and Italian occupation of Ethiopia. During an occupation, the British Somaliland annexed to Italian East Africa to Haud and Ogaden region. From this point, Italy promoted promoted and initiated the idea of "Greater Somalia", constituting Somali settled territories. By September 1940, Benito Mussolini declared the formation of Greater Somalia into the Italian Empire.  

In 1941, the British entered the Italian Somaliland, Haud and Ogaden with the help of Ethiopian armies. Soon after the restoration of Haile Selassie rule, the Haud and Ogaden region immediately placed under British military administration until Anglo-Ethiopian Agreement of 1942 warranted its sovereignty status in 1944. The first Somali nationalist group was emerged in May 1943 called Somali Youth Club (later renamed SYL) by thirteenth young Somali nationalist operating its field offices in Ogaden region, particularly in Jijiga and Kenya.

In 1946, the British foreign secretary, Ernest Bevin, proposed to the Allied Council of Foreign Ministers a plan to place the Somali-inhabited territories under the British Military Administration. Unfortunately the Bevin Plan was rejected and the Soviet Union, United States and France blatantly stood against that plan.    

In 1948, the British administration withdrew from Ogaden and without formal concession using secret agenda, the British handed the region to Ethiopia. Thus, the modern Somali Region united to Ethiopia. In 1955, the British administration withdrew from the Haud and the Reserved Area, and Ethiopia took all over the territories. In March 1955, the National United Front (NUF) attempted to retake the Haud and the Reserved Area and to end the Somalia rule under British protectorate, culminating in series violent clashes and conflicts.

In 1958, the UN Trusteeship Council appointed arbitration tribunal for the disputed territories between Ethiopia and Somalia with futile effort. Somalia constantly denied the Anglo-Ethiopian delimitation of 1897 and provided no legal recognition. In 1948 and 1954 discontent led to liberate and cede the Greater Somalia and subsequently denied the validity of Anglo-Ethiopian Agreement of 1897.

1960–1995

Following Somalia's independence in 1960, its successive government launched campaign what they called "lost territories" and raised the issues to regional and international communities like the United Nations and Organization of Islamic countries. Consecutive governments of Somalia attempted to incorporate the regions and established the Somali Republic to achieve Greater Somalia. The hostility between Ethiopia and Somalia relations grew faster, even garnered international interests involving Somali pastoralists and Ethiopian police forces in the region. In February 1964, a brief war was started in the border until Sudan mediates in front of Organization of African Unity. Minister from both sides met in Khartoum to announce ceasefire with 15 km military withdrawal from both sides.

In 1966, Ethiopia suspended martial law in the Somali Region and neighboring Oromo region accompanied by shocking retribution against herders to force them renounce their support for the fighters. Many of these were applied through confiscation, arbitrary arrests, to control water points and destroying their livestock.  

In 1973, Western Somali Liberation Front (WSLF) was established and recruit reluctant inhabitants of the region. Somalia supported WSLF,  Somali Abo Liberation Front (SALF) and Oromo Liberation Front (OLF) to weaken the Ethiopian forces in the region as well to destabilize the country. In 1977, large-scale war launched known as Ogaden War after Somali National Army crossed the border into Ethiopia and carried out military operations in Degehabur, Kebri Dahar, Warder and Godey taking control of Jijiga and other western region in the first few weeks of the war. The Soviet Union, Cuba, and South Yemen supported Ethiopia's Derg government led by Colonel Mengistu Haile Mariam and force Somali troops back to the area occupied and led to weakening the government. In March 1978, Siad Barre recalled his army from Ethiopia.

After the Derg collapse, many Somalis returned to Ethiopia in May 1991 after they evacuated in 1960s. Some of these were senior military leaders and political entrepreneurs to form the Ethiopian People's Revolutionary Democratic Front (EPRDF). In 1994, new constitution was drafted marked with the creation of Somali Region drawn to other regions.

Demographics
In Ethiopia, Somalis estimated around 7,650,000 and 99.86% population are Islam, while 0.14% are Christian, only 0.03% follow Evangelical Protestant. According to 2008 census based on Central Statistical Authority, Somali was the third largest ethnic group in Ethiopia with 4,560,000 population, accounting 6.2% after Oromo (34.4%), Amhara (27%). Based on the 1994 census projection for the 2008, at least 4.5 million Somali live in the Somali Region of Ethiopia.

In 2009, Ethiopia has an estimated 135,000 asylum seekers and refugees, mostly from Somalia (64,000).

Sources
 Somali Region in Ethiopia: Historical Developments during the Period 1884-1995

References

Ethnic groups in Ethiopia
Ethnic Somali people
Somali Region